Club Deportivo Íscar is a Spanish football team based in Íscar, in the autonomous community of Castile and León. Founded in 1968, it holds its home matches at Estadio Municipal San Miguel, with a capacity of 2,000 seats.

Season to season

11 seasons in Tercera División

Notable players
 Benjamín
 Víctor Andrés

References

External links
Official website 
Futbolme team profile 

Football clubs in Castile and León
Association football clubs established in 1968
Divisiones Regionales de Fútbol clubs
1968 establishments in Spain
Province of Valladolid